Unión Deportiva Arroyomolinos is a Spanish football club based in Arroyomolinos, in the Community of Madrid. Founded in 1993, it plays in Primera Regional de Aficionados – Group 4; its stadium is Estadio La Dehesa.

Season to season

References 
futmadrid.com profile
ffmadrid.es profile

Football clubs in the Community of Madrid
Divisiones Regionales de Fútbol clubs
Association football clubs established in 1993
1993 establishments in Spain